Kvelertak is a Norwegian heavy metal band from Stavanger, formed in 2007. The group comprises vocalist Ivar Nikolaisen, guitarists Vidar Landa, Bjarte Lund Rolland and Maciek Ofstad, bassist Marvin Nygaard and drummer Håvard Takle Ohr. Founding member and lead singer Erlend Hjelvik left the group in 2018, being replaced by Ivar Nikolaisen. Most of Kvelertak's songs have Norwegian lyrics, and their main influences are rock and roll, black metal and punk rock.

The band's self-titled debut album was released in 2010 and sold more than 15,000 copies in Norway. The second album, Meir, was released in 2013, followed by Nattesferd in 2016 and Splid in 2020. Splid was the band's first album with Ivar Nikolaisen on lead vocals.

History

Formation and debut album (2007–2011)

Kvelertak were formed in Stavanger, Norway, in 2007. A demo, Westcoast Holocaust, was self-released that year. The band released their debut album, Kvelertak, on 21 June 2010 via the Norwegian record label Indie Recordings, and on 15 March via The End Records in North America. The album was certified gold by IFPI in Norway for selling over 15,000 copies.

In March 2011, Kvelertak were presented with two Spellemannprisen Awards, a prestigious Norwegian music award similar to the American Grammy Award—for Best Newcomer and Best Rock Band. The Kvelertak song "Mjød" was used as the end music for the film The Troll Hunter.

Meir and Nattesferd (2012–2017)

The second album, Meir, was released on 25 March 2013 (26 March in the US) via Sony Music Scandinavia in Scandinavia, Roadrunner Records in the rest of the world, and by Indie Recordings on vinyl. Kvelertak has also attracted a following from renowned artists such as Metallica front man James Hetfield who, along with the Norwegian Crown Prince Haakon, watched the band perform in San Francisco. Hetfield also posted a video on his Instagram account of him watching the band and describing the front man Hjelvik as a "savage" frontman. Marvin Nygaard was voted sexiest man in Norway in 2013 

The band's third studio album, titled Nattesferd, was released on 13 May 2016. They opened for Metallica on their WorldWired Tour between September 2017 and May 2018 in Europe, and was also the opening act for Ghost on their Popestar Tour in 2017.

Lineup change and Splid (2018–present)

In July 2018, Erlend Hjelvik announced that he had left the band. His replacement, Ivar Nikolaisen (of Silver and The Good, The Bad and The Zugly), was announced on 20 July at their show in Fjellparkfestivalen, Flekkefjord – he had previously featured as a guest vocalist on 'Blodtørst'.

Kvelertak released their fourth studio album, Splid, on 14 February 2020. Hjelvik released his solo album, Welcome to Hel, on 20 November 2020.

Discography

Studio albums

EPs 
Gojira/Kvelertak Live (2013, split with Gojira)

Singles
"Mjød" (2010)
"Blodtørst" (2010)
"Bruane brenn" (2013)
"Kvelertak" (2013)
"1985" (2016)
"Berserkr" (2016)
"Bråtebrann" (2019)
"Crack of Doom" (feat. Troy Sanders) (2020)

Demos 
Westcoast Holocaust (2007)

Awards 
2010: Two times Spellemannprisen in the categories best Rock band and this years Newcomer, for the self-titled album Kvelertak

Band members 
Current members

Vidar Landa – guitar (2007–present)
Bjarte Lund Rolland – guitar, backing vocals (2007–present)
Marvin Nygaard – bass (2007–present)
Maciek Ofstad – guitar, backing vocals (2009–present)
Ivar Nikolaisen – lead vocals (2018–present)
Håvard Takle Ohr – drums (2019–present)

Past members
Erlend Hjelvik – lead vocals (2007–2018)
Anders Mosness – guitar (2007–2009), drums (2007–2008)
Kjetil Gjermundrød – drums (2008–2019)
Others
Steve Moore – drums (session) (2019)

Timeline

References

External links 

 

Spellemannprisen winners
Norwegian hard rock musical groups
Norwegian hardcore punk groups
Norwegian black metal musical groups
Musical groups established in 2007
Musical groups from Stavanger
Norwegian heavy metal musical groups
Roadrunner Records artists